The Oakland Athletics' 1997 season was the team's 30th in Oakland, California. It was also the 97th season in the franchise history. The team finished fourth in the American League West with a record of 65-97.

Coming off a surprising (if still mediocre) 78-84 campaign, The Athletics hoped to reach the playoffs for the first time since 1992. With this in mind, the team traded for a slugger, Jose Canseco. Canseco, who had played for the Athletics from 1985 to 1992, was reunited with fellow superstar (and fellow "Bash Brother") Mark McGwire. In addition to McGwire and Canseco, Oakland's impressive collection of power hitters included Jason Giambi, Gerónimo Berroa, and Matt Stairs.

Little was done, however, to shore up the Athletics' abysmal 1996 pitching staff. Ariel Prieto, owner of a 4.41 career ERA (Earned Run Average), was named the Opening Day starter; a succession of poorly regarded players filled out the rest of the starting rotation and bullpen. While optimism remained high for the team's offense, great concern remained for its pitching staff.

In the end, Oakland's offense and pitching both fared terribly. For the second consecutive year, no Athletics pitcher won ten or more games; even worse, no starter won more than six. None of the team's top four starters (Ariel Prieto, Steve Karsay, Mike Oquist, and Dave Telgheder) finished the season with an ERA of less than 5.00; the Athletics, as a team, finished with an earned run average of 5.48 (easily the MLB's worst). All told, the A's allowed a season total of 946 runs. This remains the worst such figure in Oakland history.

More puzzling was the fate of the offense. Oakland, as expected, remained one of the league's best power-hitting teams. The Athletics' sluggers hit a total of 197 home runs (third-most in the American League). Oakland's home runs failed to generate much offense, however, as a low team batting average negated most of the team's other advantages. Oakland scored a total of 764 runs in 1997 (the 11th highest total in the American League).

These awful performances quickly removed the A's from contention. On May 31, they were already nine games out of first place; their position steadily worsened throughout the summer. In light of this, General Manager Sandy Alderson traded Mark McGwire (who, at the time, was on pace to break Roger Maris' single-season home run record) to the St. Louis Cardinals for T.J. Matthews, Blake Stein, and Eric Ludwick. McGwire would finish the season with 58 home runs (four shy of breaking the record). The trade was a disaster on the Athletics' end, as none of the three players received in the trade panned out. The A's ultimately finished twenty-five games behind the first-place Seattle Mariners. Their 65-97 finish (the club's worst since 1979) led to the removal of Sandy Alderson as General Manager on October 17, he was replaced by Billy Beane. Manager Art Howe, however, was retained for the 1998 season.

The 1997 season would ultimately prove to be the Athletics' nadir. The continued rise of Jason Giambi, the debuts of Ben Grieve and Miguel Tejada, the acquisition of Tim Hudson in the 1997 MLB draft, and the ascension of Billy Beane to the position of general manager paved the way for a lengthy period of success from 1999 onwards.

Offseason
October 2, 1996: Dane Johnson was selected off waivers by the Oakland Athletics from the Toronto Blue Jays.
November 19, 1996: Mike Oquist was signed as a free agent with the Oakland Athletics.
 December 9, 1996: Frank Catalanotto was drafted by the Oakland Athletics from the Detroit Tigers in the 1996 rule 5 draft.
 January 27, 1997: John Wasdin was traded by the Oakland Athletics to the Boston Red Sox for Jose Canseco.
 March 21, 1997: Frank Catalanotto was returned (earlier draft pick) by the Oakland Athletics to the Detroit Tigers.
March 27, 1997: Scott Service was selected off waivers by the Oakland Athletics from the Cincinnati Reds.

Regular season
Ben Grieve had five RBI's in his major league debut.

Transactions
April 4, 1997: Scott Service was selected off waivers by the Cincinnati Reds from the Oakland Athletics.
April 8, 1997: Brent Mayne was signed as a free agent with the Oakland Athletics.
June 3, 1997: Tim Hudson was drafted by the Oakland Athletics in the 6th round of the 1997 amateur draft. Player signed June 13, 1997.
 July 31, 1997 – Mark McGwire was traded by Oakland Athletics to the St. Louis Cardinals for Eric Ludwick, T. J. Mathews, and Blake Stein. McGwire had 34 home runs and 81 RBIs with Oakland at the time of the trade, which reunited him with former Athletics manager Tony La Russa.
August 8, 1997: Tilson Brito was selected off waivers by the Oakland Athletics from the Toronto Blue Jays.

Season standings

Record vs. opponents

Roster

Player stats

Batting

Starters by position
Note: Pos = Position; G = Games played; AB = At bats; R = Runs scored; H = Hits; Avg. = Batting average; HR = Home runs; RBI = Runs batted in; SB = Stolen Bases

Other batters
Note: G = Games played; AB = At bats; R = Runs scored; H = Hits; Avg. = Batting average; HR = Home runs; RBI = Runs batted in; SB = Stolen Bases

Pitching

Starting pitchers 
Note: G = Games pitched; IP = Innings pitched; W = Wins; L = Losses; ERA = Earned run average; BB = Walks allowed; SO = Strikeouts

Other pitchers 
Note: G = Games pitched; IP = Innings pitched; W = Wins; L = Losses; ERA = Earned run average; SO = Strikeouts

Relief pitchers 
Note: G = Games pitched; IP = Innings pitched; W = Wins; L = Losses; SV = Saves; ERA = Earned run average; SO = Strikeouts

Awards and records
Mark McGwire, Major League record, 1st player to lead the Major Leagues in Home Runs but not lead the American League or National League in home runs

Farm system 

LEAGUE CHAMPIONS: Edmonton

References

Sources
1997 Oakland Athletics team page at Baseball Reference
1997 Oakland Athletics team page at www.baseball-almanac.com

Oakland Athletics seasons
Oakland Athletics season
Oak